Sergei Borisovich Morozov (born 3 March 1989) is a Russian professional footballer who plays for Uzbekistani club FK Turon Yaypan.

Club career
He made his professional debut in the Russian First Division in 2007 for FC Torpedo Moscow.

International career
Morozov was one of the key members of the Russian U-17 squad that won the 2006 UEFA U-17 Championship.

References

External links

1989 births
Footballers from Moscow
Living people
Russian footballers
Russia youth international footballers
Russia under-21 international footballers
Association football defenders
FC Torpedo Moscow players
FC SKA-Khabarovsk players
FC Neftekhimik Nizhnekamsk players
FC Amkar Perm players
FC Avangard Kursk players
FC KAMAZ Naberezhnye Chelny players
FC Zvezda Perm players
FC Volga Ulyanovsk players
Russian First League players
Russian Second League players
Uzbekistan Super League players
Russian expatriate footballers
Expatriate footballers in Uzbekistan
Russian expatriate sportspeople in Uzbekistan